The Ministry for the Press and the Media of Greece was a government department of Greece.

History
The ministry has its origins in the Department of Press and Tourism formed on 29 August 1936. Until 1974, the Department functioned in various organisational forms, such as General Directorate of Press and Information, the Department of Press and Information, the Ministry of Press and Information, either as a self-contained department, or under the Office of the Prime Minister, sometimes as part of the government presidency, and other times under the Ministry of Foreign Affairs.

From 1974 to 1994, it functioned as the Secretariat General of Press and Information under the Ministry of the Presidency of the Government. In 1994, under Presidential Decree 181, it was consolidated as the Ministry of Press and Mass Media.

In 2004, the ministry was dissolved and two General Secretariats under the Prime Minister were established: The Secretariat General of Communication and the Secretariat General of Information, which incorporated the functions of the defunct ministry.

On 26 May 2004, the prime minister placed the two secretariats under the aegis of the Minister of State.

Ministers for the Press and the Media (1994 – 2004)

References

Defunct government ministries of Greece
Lists of government ministers of Greece